Oprah's Master Class (or Oprah Presents: Master Class, as it was titled in the first season) is a primetime television program that airs on the OWN: Oprah Winfrey Network. The series premiered on the network's first day, January 1, 2011.

Concept

According to OWN, Master Class "tells the stories you've never heard from the people you thought you knew best. Hand-picked by Oprah Winfrey for their unique impact on the world, true modern masters from Academy Award-winning actors, to Grammy-winning musicians, to ground-breaking athletes, share the greatest lessons they've learned along the way. In an intimate setting, they share their successes, failures, triumphs, disappointments and heartbreaks."

Each episode features an in-depth conversation with the subject, as they explore their story with viewers. The conversation is split up into numerous lessons that each master teaches, using personal anecdotes from their life to illustrate the point. Video clips, photographs, and re-enactments illustrate a visual representation of the stories being told. The biographical sketch is interspersed with personal insights and reflections from Oprah Winfrey on each master's life lessons.

Overview

Episodes

Season One (2011)

The first season of Oprah Presents: Master Class premiered on Saturday January 1, 2011 on the first day of the launch of OWN: Oprah Winfrey Network, with rapper, songwriter, and entrepreneur Jay-Z. The first season aired weekly on Sundays at 10/9c and consists of eight hour-long episodes.

Season Two (2012)

The second season of Oprah's Master Class premiered on Sunday January 8, 2012 at 10/9c on OWN: Oprah Winfrey Network with actress, writer, and activist Jane Fonda. The second season premiered to record-high numbers for the series, with 930,000 viewers tuning into Fonda's Master Class. The second season aired weekly on Sundays at 10/9c and consists of ten hour-long episodes.

Season Three (2013)

The third season of Oprah's Master Class premiered on March 3, 2013, at 10/9c with an episode featuring singer-songwriter Alicia Keys. The third season aired weekly on Sundays at 10/9c and consists of eight hour-long episodes.

Season Four (2014)

Oprah's Master Class returned to OWN on May 11, 2014, with an episode featuring Justin Timberlake. The fourth season aired weekly on Sundays at 10/9c and consists of ten hour-long episodes.

Season Five (2015)

Oprah's Master Class returned to OWN on Sunday October 25, 2015 with an episode featuring Ellen DeGeneres. The fifth season aired weekly on Sundays at 8/7c and consists of seven hour-long episodes.

Season Six (2017-18)

Oprah's Master Class returned to OWN on Saturday June 10, 2017 with a sneak-preview episode featuring Kevin Hart.

Specials

Awards and nominations

International broadcast
 — The series premiered on Discovery Home & Health from October 27, 2013.

References

External links
 
 
 

Oprah Winfrey
Oprah Winfrey Network original programming
2011 American television series debuts
2018 American television series endings
English-language television shows
Television series by Harpo Productions